Roy Peter Clark (born 1948) is an American writer, editor, and a writing coach. He is also senior scholar and vice president of the Poynter Institute for Media Studies, a journalism think-tank in St. Petersburg, Florida, and is the founder of the National Writers Workshop. Clark has appeared on several radio and television talk shows, speaking about ethics in journalism and other writing issues.

Life and career 
Clark is a native of the Lower East Side of New York City, and was raised on Long Island. His mother was of half-Italian and half-Jewish ancestry (Clark was raised Catholic). Clark earned a degree in English (1970) from Providence College, Rhode Island, where he was editor of The Alembic, a literary journal, and managing editor of the student-run newspaper, The Cowl. From there, Clark earned a Ph.D. in English, specializing in medieval literature, from the State University of New York at Stony Brook.

In 1974, Clark accepted a position teaching English at Auburn University at Montgomery, Alabama. Newspaper columns he wrote during that time attracted the attention of Eugene Patterson, editor of the St. Petersburg Times. Patterson hired Clark in 1977 as a reporter and to work with the newspaper’s staff as a writing coach.

Since 1979, Clark has worked as a faculty member at the Poynter Institute, the non-profit organization that now owns Times Publishing Company, which publishes the St. Petersburg Times. Clark is listed as one of the Directors and Officers of  The Poynter Institute  Andrea Pitzer, writing for the Nieman Foundation for Journalism at Harvard University, has called Clark “one of narrative journalism’s hardest working midwives.”

He has written the books Writing Tools: 50 Essential Strategies for Every Writer (Little, Brown and Company, 2006) and The Glamour of Grammar: A Guide to the Magic and Mystery of Practical English (Little, Brown and Company, 2010), and Help! For Writers: 210 Solutions to the Problems Every Writer Faces (Little, Brown and Company, 2011).

Clark and his wife, Karen, have three daughters.

Works

Academic works 
Clark wrote several articles based on Geoffrey Chaucer's The Canterbury Tales, some of which were published in The Chaucer Review and in which he discusses Chaucer's parodying of Church teachings and rituals. His Ph.D. dissertation was titled "Chaucer and Medieval Scatology."

Journalism 
As a journalist, Clark revitalized the serial article form when, in 1996, he wrote a 29-part serial narrative piece called Three Little Words which chronicled the story of one family's experience with AIDS. The article generated more than 8,000 phone calls to the newspaper.

Clark has also written and edited books about journalism, some of which are used as textbooks in college journalism courses, including Coaching Writers: Editors and Reporters Working Together (St. Martin's Press,1991, with Don Fry), the second edition of which was titled Coaching Writers: Editors and Reporters Working Together across Media Platforms (Bedford-St. Martin's, 2003, with Don Fry), and Journalism: The Democratic Craft (Oxford University Press, 2005, with G. Stuart Adam).

On writing 

Clark has taught writing to professional journalists, scholastic journalists (generally speaking, the student producers of high school and other student-run newspapers), and elementary school students.

In his book, Free to Write: A Journalist Teaches Young Writers (Heinemann, 1987/1995), and in other writing, Clark advocates putting the responsibility for correcting written work on the student rather than on the teacher.

Clark's more recent books are useful to writers of all genres and of all ages and discuss the power of language as well as how to wield that power.

Writing Tools: 50 Essential Strategies for Every Writer (Little, Brown and Company, 2006) grew out of a series of columns written for Poynter. Clark discusses the 50 tools, including the "clarity and narrative energy" (p. 12) that comes with using right-branching sentences, in podcasts, which, according to Poynter, have been "downloaded more than a million times."

In The Glamour of Grammar: A Guide to the Magic and Mystery of Practical English (Little, Brown and Company, 2010), Clark traces the words 'glamour' and 'grammar' back to their common roots.

Clark also reports on how other writers write, as he did in a 2002 Poynter column about radio script writing, which he wrote after listening to a lecture by NPR reporter John Burnett.

Radio and television appearances 
Clark participated in a discussion on the January 26, 2006, episode of The Oprah Winfrey Show, "Journalists Speak Out." Clark, along with then New York Times columnist Frank Rich and Washington Post columnist Richard Cohen discussed the veracity of James Frey's memoir, A Million Little Pieces, which had been exposed by The Smoking Gun as being at least partially fictionalized.

Selected bibliography

Books 
 Clark, R. P., and Fry, D. (1991). Coaching Writers: Editors and Reporters Working Together. New York, NY: St. Martin's Press.
 Adam, G. S., and Clark, R. P. (2005). Journalism: The Democratic Craft. New York, NY: Oxford University Press.
 Clark, R. P., and Fry, D. (2003). Coaching Writers: Editors and Reporters Working Together across Media Platforms (2nd Ed.). New York, NY: Bedford-St. Martin's.

Academic articles 
 Clark, R. P. (1976). Christmas Games in Chaucer's The Miller's Tale. Studies in Short Fiction, 13(3), 277.
 Clark, R. P. (Fall, 1976). Doubting Thomas in Chaucer's Summoner's Tale. The Chaucer Review, 11(2), 164-178.

Newspaper articles 
 Clark, R. P. (1996) Sadie's Ring. Originally published in the Charlotte (N.C.) Observer and theMiami Herald.
 Clark, R. P. (February, 1996). Three Little Words. Originally published in The St. Petersburg Times.

References

External links 
 www.poynter.org
 www.tampabay.com

1948 births
Living people
Providence College alumni
American male writers
Writers of style guides